INFO is an industrial metal, industrial rock band from Bogotá D.C., Colombia.

History

Origins (2000–2004) 
On late 2000, Camilo Z. (vocals - guitar), Alex L. (drums) and John C. (lead guitar) got together to start a post-punk project that did not have a bassist. In the search of a bass player they met Milton R., who was drummer for the alternative rock band Santaraña and groove metal band BrujoNitro. Milton R. quit percussion to join the band as bassist. It should be noted as a precedent that Alex L. was a substitute drummer in the rock band 1280 Almas, a band whose boom in the 90s made them famous in the Colombian rock scene. Once this line-up was defined, the band took a new sound path, leaving post-punk and post-grunge behind to search for its own, more contemporary sound, moving away from the Nü-metal sound that was so fashionable in Colombia on those years. Working experimentally in underground, INFO matures its proposal to officially present it in 2008.

The name INFO refers to the word information, which represents everything that the new man needs: there are no longer limits to having information... "the Internet, the media, the networks are at the hand of every human being to be exploited in pursuit of evolution" (John C. in an interview for Radioactiva 97.9 FM, Colombia - March 2005).

The name of the band arose in a spontaneous conversation about the change of the actual project name and was proposed by Milton R. in order to call the band the same in Spanish or English, taking as a point of inspiration the intro sample of the song Hero from the album Psalm 69: The Way to Succeed and the Way to Suck Eggs by the band Ministry.

First steps on industrial rock (2004–2008) 
Looking for an advanced sound that would distinguish them in the new Colombian trends, Milton R. introduced the first programming sequences made with in a desktop computer creating the bass line of the song La Marcha using software from Image Line and Native Instruments. This new proposal of electronic rock combined with usual rock live instruments started the beginning of the band's full exploration of the sounds of industrial rock.

Working on what would be this new industrial-electro sound for the band, they worked in the studio for two years until they released a 4-song EP that was released in 2006, which included a version of Muevete , an original Colombian rock classic from the mythical Estados Alterados. The song had the approval of Estados Alterados and was broadcast on alternative music channels in Bogota.

By this time the group's musical influences are German industrial music, EBM and the sounds of bands like Nine Inch Nails, Rammstein, Die Krupps and Pain.

Then they recorded their first video clip with the support of Billig Cinema, an independent company that produces audio and video productions. The direction was in charge of Larry Paipa and the chosen song was "La Marcha". The video rotated through channels with specialized shows such as CityTv in Bogotá and Musinet in Medellín. As the second video, the single Muevete was chosen, recorded in June 2005, once again directed by Larry Paipa with a more ambitious production than the first video. By this time the band had the participation of Damian C. on keyboards, who left the band in 2006 to undertake personal projects.

Consolidation (2008–2011) 
In 2006 the band was invited to play on finals of the Festival de Rock Universitario in Bogota, Colombia. It was also summoned among the 32 preselected acts for the edition XII Rock al Parque Festival. They plerformed at the Electronic Tortazo 2006 at the Media Torta Open Air Theater in December 2006 alongside the best exponents of electro rock from Bogota. By June 2008, once their industrial metal sound had been consolidated the band performed as guests at Colombia's first gothic and industrial music festival, Bogota In Darkness. They participated in the Rock in Construction 2 festival in Surfonica, winning among more than 30 bands from various rock genres. They were representatives for Bogotá at the Cali Underground festival in 2008 and 2009 versions.

The activity of the band can be summarized as follows:

 Cali Underground Fest 2008.
 Nominated for Best Electro Rock Artist Shock Awards 2008.
 Cali Underground 2009.
 Trivium Fest 2009.
 "Una Canción para Tocar la Vida" Fest 2009.
 Calibre Fest 2009, Cali, CO.
 Manizales Grita Rock Fest 2010.
 "Chapinero Localidad Gótica" documentary – live recording at the Vinacure Museum (Bogotá, CO)
 XVII Rock al Parque Festival 2011
 VIVA! Festival 2011 (Pereira, CO)
 Facatativa Rocktown 2011 Fest.
 Rock al Aire Libre Fest 2011, Calarca, CO.
 Nominated for Best Live Band Subterránica Awards 2012.
 Opening act of Pain at Colombia – Winners by contest.
 Anti Roscas Fest 2012 (Bogotá, CO)
 Calarca Metal Fest 2012 – (Calarca, CO)
 2.º. Rock & Metal Pacho Festival 2012.
 VIVA! Festival 2012.
 "La Escena Rock" magazine. For this issue the band was on cover photo and central article.
 Rock Streaming 2012 Orbita Rock.
 Gothic Fest II: opening act for Theatres des Vampires (Bogotá, CO) 2013.
 Manizales Grita Rock Fest 2013.
 Car Audio Rock Festival 2014 - opening act for LITA FORD.
 Rock al Parque Festival 20 Años (Bogotá, CO)
 Jingle Bell Rock Radioactiva 2014 (Bogotá, CO)
 Tattoo Music Fest I (Bogotá, CO)
 XIV Metal de las Montañas Fest, (Bogotá, CO)
 Winners Best Art of an Album (NITRO INVERNO) Subterranica Awards
 Opening act of COMBICHRIST & HOCICO in Colombia.
 Rock X Festival 2016 (Bogotá, CO)
 Calarca Metal Fest 10 Años (Calarca, CO)
 Cali Gothic Fest 2018 (Cali, CO)
 Rock X Fest 2018 (Bogotá, CO)
 Opening act of ELUVEITIE in Colombia
 Winners ALBUM OF THE YEAR Subterranica Awards (NEURODRÓN)
 XVII Metal de las Montañas Fest (Bogotá, CO)
 ROCK AL PARQUE 25 AÑOS FEST (Bogotá, CO)
 Shama Fest 2019 (Entrerríos, CO)
 Rock al Río Fest 2019 (Rionegro, CO)
 Rock Hyntiba Fest 2020 (Bogotá, CO)
 Ace of Spades Live Sessions (Bogotá, CO)
 FIURA Unirock Alternativo Fest (Online)

Inferno 2Ø51 (2022) 

The third album released by the band is vinyl Inferno 2Ø51 9" vynil, which is a collection of the favorite songs of the members of the bands that were released on the previous albums, including the song "31" as the only new song included on the record. These songs were re-recorded with Carbu on vocals as well as all the instruments, distributed by the record label Viuda Negra Music (Colombia) to be released on March, 2022.

Band members
 Carbu - vocals
 Milton R. - bass guitar
 Adriana V. - keyboards
 Camilo J. - drums
 John C. - guitar

Past members
 Daniel T. - lead vocals (2018–2020)
 Damian C. - keyboards (2004–2006)
 Camilo Z. - lead vocals (2000–2011)
 Alex L. - drums (2000–2010)

Discography

Albums
 Inferno 2Ø51 - 2022
 Neurodrón - 2018
 Nitro Inverno - 2015

EPs
 Info - (2005)

Singles
 Info Digital - (2006)

DVD
 La Marcha (de los monos mutantes) - (2005)

References

External links
 Página central del grupo
 Página del grupo en Facebook
 Perfil oficial del grupo en Instagram
 Canal del grupo en YouTube

Colombian industrial music groups
Musical groups from Bogotá